The Pakistan Historical Society (PHS) is a democratically organized organization founded in 1950. The Society promotes historical research through the publication of research monographs, the compilation and publication of original sources, and their authoritative translations. Its officials and members of the executive committee are elected for a term of three years. From 1953, the society began publishing a quarterly research journal, now known as Historics.

Journal of Pakistan Historical Society - "Historicus"
The Journal of the Pakistan Historical Society (Historics) is a quarterly research journal of international repute, published by the PHS since 1953 without interruption. It is publishing its 68th volume.

References

External links
Pakistan Historical Society
PHS second website

1950 establishments in Pakistan
Historical societies
Organizations established in 1950